Olive Dorothea Graeme Wilton (1883–1971) was an English-born stage actor, theatre producer and speech and drama teacher who worked extensively in England and Australia. She came to Australia in 1906 and decided to settle there. She played the title role in the 1910 Australian silent film The Squatter's Daughter. The last years of her life were spent in Tasmania, where she became a noted figure in education, radio and the arts.

Select credits

Acting 
The Man from Mexico (1906) – play, Theatre Royal, Adelaide
The Vagabond and The Talk of the Town (1906) – play, Theatre Royal, Adelaide
The Bushwoman  (1909) – play, Kings Theatre, Melbourne 
The Squatter's Daughter (1910) – film
By Wireless Telegraphy (1910) – play, Kings Theatre, Melbourne
The Winning Ticket (1910) – play, Kings Theatre, Melbourne
My Mate, or a Bush Love Story (1911) – play, Kings Theatre, Melbourne
The Girl of the Never Never (1912) – play, Kings Theatre, Melbourne
Damaged Goods (1916) – play, Theatre Royal, Melbourne
Daddy Long Legs (1917) – play, Criterion Theatre, Sydney
The Doctor's Dilemma (1919) – play, Kings Theatre, Melbourne
Kindling (1920) – play, Kings Theatre, Melbourne

Directing and/or producing 
A Bill of Divorcement (1927) – play, Prince of Wales Theatre, Hobart
Daybreak (1938) – play, Theatre Royal, Hobart

References

External links
Olive Wilton at AusStage

1883 births
1971 deaths
20th-century Australian actresses